The Treaty of Stralsund (24 May 1370) ended the war between the Hanseatic League and the kingdom of Denmark. The Hanseatic League reached the peak of its power by the conditions of this treaty.

The war began in 1361, when Danish king Valdemar Atterdag conquered Scania, Öland, and Gotland with the major Hanseatic town Visby. In 1362, a Hanseatic counterstrike was repelled by the Danish fleet at Helsingborg, which led Hansa to accept a truce culminating in the unfavourable Treaty of Vordingborg (1365), depriving the league of much of its privileges. Unwilling to accept the treaty, the Hanseatic League, which used to be a trade league rather than a political union, raised a fleet through the Confederation of Cologne in 1367 and renewed their Swedish alliances. In the following battles, Valdemar and his Norwegian son-in-law Hakon VI were utterly defeated.

The treaty was negotiated for Denmark by drost Henning Podebusk and for the Hanseatic League by the burgomasters Jakob Pleskow of Lübeck and Bertram Wulflam of Stralsund. In the treaty, the freedom of Visby was reestablished. Furthermore, Denmark had to assure the Hanseatic League of free trade in the entire Baltic Sea. This gave the Hanseatic League a monopoly on the Baltic fish trade. The league also gained the right to veto against Danish throne candidates.

See also
List of treaties
Second Danish-Hanseatic War

References
 Dollinger, Philippe (1999). The German Hansa. Routledge. .

Stralsund
Stralsund, Treaty of
1370 in Europe
1370s in Denmark
1370s in the Holy Roman Empire
History of Lübeck
History of Pomerania
Stralsund
14th century in Denmark
Stralsund
Stralsund